Robert Jocelyn, Viscount Jocelyn (20 February 1816 – 12 August 1854), was a British soldier and Conservative politician.

Background
Born at Carlton Gardens, London, Jocelyn was the eldest son and heir apparent of Robert Jocelyn, 3rd Earl of Roden, and the Hon. Maria Frances Catherine, daughter of Thomas Stapleton, 12th Baron le Despencer.

Military career

Jocelyn served in the First Opium War as Military Secretary to Lord Saltoun. He published two works on his experiences of the conflict. In 1853 he was appointed Lieutenant-Colonel Commandant of the East Sussex Militia.

Political career
Jocelyn was Member of Parliament for King's Lynn from 1842 to 1854. He served under Sir Robert Peel as Joint Secretary to the Board of Control between 1845 and 1846.

Family
Lord Jocelyn married Lady Frances Elizabeth, daughter of Peter Clavering-Cowper, 5th Earl Cowper, in 1841. They had several children. In 1854, while his regiment, the East Essex Militia, was quartered in the Tower of London, he contracted cholera and died in London in August of that year, aged 38, predeceasing his father by 16 years. His eldest son Robert later succeeded in the earldom. Lady Jocelyn died in March 1880.

Works
Jocelyn, Robert (1841). Six Months with the Chinese Expedition; or, Leaves from a Soldier's Note-book (2nd ed.). London: John Murray.

References

Biography at worldroots.com

External links

1816 births
1854 deaths
British courtesy viscounts
British military personnel of the First Opium War
Heirs apparent who never acceded
Members of the Parliament of the United Kingdom for English constituencies
UK MPs 1841–1847
UK MPs 1847–1852